Hemachandra was a 12th century Indian Jain saint, scholar, poet, mathematician, philosopher, yogi, grammarian, law theorist, historian, lexicographer, rhetorician, logician, and prosodist. Noted as a prodigy by his contemporaries, he gained the title kalikālasarvajña, "the knower of all knowledge in his times" and father of Gujarati language.

Born as Changadeva, he was ordained in the Śvētāmbara school of Jainism in 1110 and took the name Somachandra. In 1125 he became an adviser to King Kumarapala and wrote Arhanniti, a work on politics from a Jain perspective. He also produced Trishashti-shalaka-purusha-charita (“Deeds of the 63 Illustrious Men”), a Sanskrit epic poem on the history of important figures of Jainism. Later in his life, he changed his name to Hemachandra.

Early life

Hemachandra was born in Dhandhuka, in present-day Gujarat, on Kartika Sud Purnima (the full moon day of Kartika month). His date of birth differs according to sources but 1088 is generally accepted. His father, Chachiga-deva was a Modh Bania Vaishnava. His mother, Pahini, was a Jain. Hemchandra's original given name was Changadeva. In his childhood, the Jain monk Devachandra Suri visited Dhandhuka and was impressed by the young Hemachandra's intellect. His mother and maternal uncle concurred with Devachandra, in opposition to his father, that Hemachandra be a disciple of his. Devachandra took Hemachandra to Khambhat, where Hemachandra was placed under the care of the local governor Udayana. Chachiga came to Udayana's place to take his son back, but was so overwhelmed by the kind treatment he received, that he decided to willingly leave his son with Devachandra.

Some years later, Hemachandra was initiated a Jain monk on Magha Sud Chauth (4th day of the bright half of Magha month) and was given a new name, Somchandra. Udayana helped Devchandra Suri in the ceremony. He was trained in religious discourse, philosophy, logic and grammar and became well versed in Jain and non–Jain scriptures. At the age of 21, he was ordained an acharya of the Śvētāmbara school of Jainism at Nagaur in present-day Rajasthan. At this time, he was named Hemachandra Suri.

Hemachandra and Siddharaja

At the time, Gujarat was ruled by the Chaulukya dynasty from Anhilavada (Patan). It is not certain when Hemachandra visited Patan for the first time. As Jain monks are mendicants for eight months and stay at one place during Chaturmas, the four monsoon months, he started living at Patan during these periods and produced the majority of his works there.

Probably around 1125, he was introduced to Jayasimha Siddharaja (fl. 1092–1141) and soon rose to prominence in the Chaulukya royal court. According to the Prabhavakacarita of Prabhācandra, the earliest biography of Hemachandra, Jayasimha spotted Hemachandra while passing through the streets of his capital. The king was impressed with an impromptu verse uttered by the young monk.

In 1135, when Siddharaja conquered Malwa, he brought the works of Bhoja from Dhar along with other things. One day Siddhraja came across the manuscript of Sarasvati-Kanthabharana (also known as the Lakshana Prakash), a treatise on Sanskrit grammar. He was so impressed by it that he told the scholars in his court to produce a grammar that was as easy and lucid. Hemachandra requested Siddharaja to find the eight best grammatical treatises from Kashmir. He studied them and produced a new grammar work in the style of Pāṇini's Aṣṭādhyāyī. He named his work Siddha-Hema-Śabdanuśāśana after himself and the king. Siddharaja was so pleased with the work that he ordered it to be placed on the back of an elephant and paraded through the streets of Anhilwad Patan. Hemachandra also composed the Dvyashraya Kavya, an epic on the history of the Chaulukya dynasty, to illustrate his grammar.

Hemachandra and Kumarapala

According to the Prabhachandra, there was an incident where Siddharaja wanted to kill his nephew Kumarapala because it was prophesied that the kingdom would meet its demise at Kumarapala's hands. Hemachandra hid Kumarapala under a pile of manuscripts to save him. However, such motifs are common in Indian folk literature, so it is unlikely it was an actual historical event. Also, many sources differ on Siddharaja's motives.

Hemachandra became the advisor to Kumarapala. During Kumarapala's reign, Gujarat became a center of culture. Using the Jain approach of Anekantavada, Hemchandra is said to have displayed a broad-minded attitude, which pleased Kumarapala. Kumarapala was a Shaiva and ordered the rebuilding of Somnath at Prabhas Patan. Some Hindu saints who were jealous of Hemachandra's rising popularity with the Kumarapala complained that Hemachandra was a very arrogant person, that he did not respect the vedic deities and that he refused to bow down to Hindu God Shiva. When called upon to visit the temple on the inauguration with Kumarapala, Hemachandra readily bowed before the lingam but said: Ultimately, the king became a devoted follower of Hemachandra and a champion of Jainism.

Starting in 1121, Hemachandra was involved in the construction of the Jain temple at Taranga. His influence on Kumarapala resulted in Jainism becoming the official religion of Gujarat and animal slaughter was banned in the state. The tradition of animal sacrifice in the name of religion was completely uprooted in Gujarat. As a result, even almost 900 years after Hemchandra, Gujarat still continues to be a predominantly lacto-vegetarian state, despite having an extensive coastline.

Death
He announced about his death six months in advance and fasted in his last days, a Jain practice called sallekhana. He died at Anhilavad Patan. The year of death differs according to sources but 1173 is generally accepted.

Works
A prodigious writer, Hemachandra wrote grammars of Sanskrit and Prakrit, poetry, prosody, lexicons, texts on science and logic and many branches of Indian philosophy.

Jain philosophy

His systematic exposition of the Jain path in the Yogaśāstra and its auto-commentary is a very influential text in Jain thought. According to Olle Quarnström it is "the most comprehensive treatise on Svetambara Jainism known to us".

Grammar

The Siddha-Hema-Śabdanuśāśana includes six languages: Sanskrit, the "standard" Prakrit (virtually Maharashtri Prakrit), Shauraseni, Magahi, Paiśācī, the otherwise-unattested Cūlikāpaiśācī and Apabhraṃśa (virtually Gurjar Apabhraṃśa, prevalent in the area of Gujarat and Rajasthan at that time and the precursor of Gujarati language). He gave a detailed grammar of Apabhraṃśa and also illustrated it with the folk literature of the time for better understanding. It is the only known Apabhraṃśa grammar. He wrote the grammar in form of rules, with 8 Adhyayas (Chapters) and "Tattvaprakaashika prakash" with "maharnav nyaas" in one year. Jayasimha Siddharaja had installed the grammar work in Patan's (historically Anhilpur) state library. Many copies were made of it, and many schemes were announced for the study of the grammar. Scholars named Kaakal and Kaayasth took great efforts to teach the grammar.

Politics
In 1125, he became an adviser to Kumarapala and wrote the Arhanniti, a work on politics from a Jain perspective.

Poetry

To illustrate the grammar, he produced the epic poetry Dvyashraya Kavya on the history of Chaulukya dynasty. It is an important source of history of region of the time. The epic poem Trīṣaṣṭiśalākāpuruṣacharitra or "Lives of Sixty-Three Great Men" is a hagiographical treatment of the twenty four tirthankaras and other important persons instrumental in defining the Jain philosophical position, collectively called the "śalākāpuruṣa", their asceticism and eventual liberation from the cycle of death and rebirth, as well as the legendary spread of the Jain influence. It still serves as the standard synthesis of source material for the early history of Jainism. The appendix to this work, the Pariśiṣṭaparvan or Sthavirāvalīcarita, contains his own commentary and is in itself a treatise of considerable depth It has been translated into English as The Lives of the Jain Elders. In the test, Hemchandra accepts the polyandry of Draupadi and further suggests that Draupadi was Nagasri in one of her previous lives and had poisoned a Jain monk. Therefore, she had to suffer in hell and animal incarnations for several lives before being born as woman who later became a Jain nun. After her death, she was reborn as Draupadi and was married to five pandavas. His Kavyanuprakasha follows the model of Kashmiri rhetorician Mammata's Kavya-prakasha. He quoted other scholars like Anandavardhana and Abhinavagupta in his works.

Lexicography 
Abhidhan-Chintamani (IAST abhidhāna-cintāmaṇi-kośa) is a lexicon while Anekarth Kosha is a lexicon of words bearing multiple meanings. Deshi-Shabda-Sangraho or Desi-nama-mala is the lexicon of local or non-Sanskrit origin. Niganthu Sesa is a botanical lexicon.

Prosody
He composed the Chandonushasana, a work on prosody, with commentary.

Mathematics

Hemachandra, following the earlier Gopala, described the Fibonacci sequence in around 1150, about fifty years before Fibonacci (1202). He was considering the number of cadences of length n, and showed that these could be formed by adding a short syllable to a cadence of length n − 1, or a long syllable to one of n − 2. This recursion relation F(n) = F(n − 1) + F(n − 2) is what defines the Fibonacci sequence.

He (c. 1150 AD) studied the rhythms of Sanskrit poetry. Syllables in Sanskrit are either long or short. Long syllables have twice the length of short syllables. The question he asked is How many rhythm patterns with a given total length can be formed from short and long syllables?
For example, how many patterns have the length of five short syllables (i.e. five "beats")? There are eight: SSSSS, SSSL, SSLS, SLSS, LSSS, SLL, LSL, LLS. As rhythm patterns, these are xxxxx, xxxx., xxx.x, xx.xx, x.xxx, xx.x., x.xx., x.x.x

Other works
His other works are a commentary in rhetoric work Alankara Chudamani, Abhidhana-chintamani, Pramana-mimansa (logic), Vitaraga-Stotra (prayers).

See also
 List of Indian mathematicians

Notes

 As per Dundas, (1089–??)
 As per Datta and Jain World, (1088–1173)
 As per Gujarat Gazetteers, Volume 18, (1087–1174)
 As per Indian Merchants and Entrepreneurs, (1089–1173)

References

Citations

Sources
 
 
 
 Cinnaiya, S., Nayara, H. K., & Mathura, R. (2017). Cakita kare Fibonācī. Bengaluru: Pratham Books.

External links
 Trishashti Shalaka Purusha Caritra of Hemchandra English translation of books 1-10
 Bibliography of Hemachandra's works, Item 687, Karl Potter, University of Washington
 Acharya Hemchandra by Madhya Pradesh Hindi Granth Academy
 The Rhythm of Poetry
 The Golden Mean and the Physics of Aesthetics

1080s births
1172 deaths
12th-century Indian mathematicians
12th-century Indian philosophers
Jain acharyas
History of Gujarat
Fibonacci numbers
Gujarati-language writers
Gujarati people
Cultural history of Gujarat
Indian Jain monks
12th-century Indian Jain poets
12th-century Jain monks
12th-century Indian monks
Jain law
Indian male writers
12th-century Indian historians
Scholars from Gujarat
Śvētāmbara monks